Kalamandalam Krishnan Nair (27 March 1914 – 15 August 1990) was a Kathakali dancer from Kerala in India.

Life
He learned and exhibited various styles of Kathakali.

He is a recipient of Padma Shri, Sangeet Natak Akademi Award, Kerala Sangeetha Nataka Akademi Award, and Kerala Sangeetha Nataka Akademi Fellowship.

A native of Cheruthazham in Payyanur Taluk of Kannur district in North Malabar, Kerala he was initiated into Kathakali in his early teenage years under the tutelage of Guru Chandu Panikker. By 19, he got noticed by Kerala Kalamandalam co-founder, poet Vallathol Narayana Menon, and inducted Krishnan Nair into his institute, then near Mulankunnathukavu, north of Thrissur in central Kerala. It was there that Krishnan Nair was trained under gurus of varied style—like Pattikkamthodi Ravunni Menon, Thakazhi Kunchu Kurup, Kavalappara Narayanan Nair and Mani Madhava Chakyar.

Krishnan Nair had his higher studies on Rasa-abhinaya (facial emotions which stressed on eye exercises) from the celebrated Kudiyattam maestro Natyacharya Māni Mādhava Chākyār, who too won the Padma Shri. Krishnan Nair was deeply influenced by Shri. Chakyar.

With his calibre to perform any challenging role and a flexible mindset that prompted him to occasionally do minor roles (with some new elements), Krishnan Nair was probably the pioneering Kathakali artiste who was a hardcore professional—in the sense that he was the arguably the first to dictate the rate for each of his performances. It was a watershed move in an art form that had huge feudal hangovers and its entailing element of servility that patrons expected from the artistes.

Krishnan Nair had a penchant for realistic portrayal of characters and situations that made him more popular in the Travancore belt of south Kerala. In fact, his outlandish style had made him a less acknowledged master in central and north Kerala—the very places that groomed his art in his early days.

Krishnan Nair, towards the second half of his life, had made Tripunithura near Kochi his home. Kathakali was always traditionally performed by men. In 1975 a women's group was formed and they were trained by Kalamandalam Krishnan Nair. The Tripunithura Kathakali Kendram Ladies Troupe went on to national recognition.

Krishnan Nair died on Indian Independence Day, 15 August 1990, aged 76.

See also 
 Kathakali
 Pattikkamthodi Ravunni Menon
 Guru Kunchu Kurup
 Māni Mādhava Chākyār

References 

Kathakali exponents
Recipients of the Padma Shri in arts
Malayali people
Dancers from Kerala
1914 births
1990 deaths
Performers of Indian classical dance
Recipients of the Sangeet Natak Akademi Award
People from Kannur district
Indian male dancers
20th-century Indian dancers
Recipients of the Kerala Sangeetha Nataka Akademi Fellowship
Recipients of the Kerala Sangeetha Nataka Akademi Award